The following outline is provided as an overview of and topical guide to the United States Commonwealth of Pennsylvania:

The Commonwealth of Pennsylvania is the fifth most populous of the 50 states of the United States.  Pennsylvania lies west of the Delaware River in the Mid-Atlantic United States.

King Charles II of England granted William Penn a charter for a Colony of Pennsylvania in 1681.  Philadelphia, the capital of the colony, soon rose to become the most populous city of British America.  As Britain attempted to tighten its grip on its American colonies, many prominent Pennsylvanians called for greater independence for British America.  The upper and lower counties of Pennsylvania (now known as Delaware) joined eleven other British colonies in declaring their autonomy with signing of the United States Declaration of Independence in Philadelphia on July 4, 1776.

The newly independent state chose the moniker "Commonwealth of Pennsylvania" as a token of its prominence and autonomy in the Americas.  The American states prevailed in the American War of Independence which concluded with the Treaty of Paris of 1783.  The Constitution of the United States was written in convention at Philadelphia in 1787.  The State of Delaware and the Commonwealth of Pennsylvania became the first two states to ratify the new Constitution, thus Pennsylvania is ranked as the second state to join the Union.

General reference 

 Names
 Common name: Pennsylvania
 Pronunciation: 
 Official name: Commonwealth of Pennsylvania (also known as the State of Pennsylvania)
 Abbreviations and name codes
 Postal symbol:  PA
 ISO 3166-2 code:  US-PA
 Internet second-level domain:  .pa.us
 Nicknames
 Liberty Bell State
 Independence State
 Keystone State
 Quaker State
 Adjectival: Pennsylvania
 Demonym: Pennsylvanian

Geography of Pennsylvania 

Geography of Pennsylvania
 Pennsylvania is: a U.S. state, a federal state of the United States of America
 Location
 Northern hemisphere
 Western hemisphere
 Americas
 North America
 Anglo America
 Northern America
 United States of America
 Contiguous United States
 Eastern United States
 East Coast of the United States – though Pennsylvania does not include any actual coastline, it is generally considered to be part of the Eastern Seaboard region.
 Northeastern United States
 Mid-Atlantic states
 Great Lakes Region
 Population of Pennsylvania: 12,702,379  (2010 U.S. Census)
 Area of Pennsylvania:
 Atlas of Pennsylvania

Places in Pennsylvania 

Places in Pennsylvania
 Historic places in Pennsylvania
 Abandoned communities in Pennsylvania
 Ghost towns in Pennsylvania
 National Historic Landmarks in Pennsylvania
 National Register of Historic Places listings in Pennsylvania
 Bridges on the National Register of Historic Places in Pennsylvania
 National Natural Landmarks in Pennsylvania
 State parks in Pennsylvania

Environment of Pennsylvania 

 Climate of Pennsylvania
 Geology of Pennsylvania
 Protected areas in Pennsylvania
 State forests of Pennsylvania
 Superfund sites in Pennsylvania
 Wildlife of Pennsylvania
 Fauna of Pennsylvania
 Birds of Pennsylvania
 Mammals of Pennsylvania

Natural geographic features of Pennsylvania 

 Lakes of Pennsylvania
 Rivers of Pennsylvania

Regions of Pennsylvania 

 Lehigh Valley
 Northern Pennsylvania
 Northeastern Pennsylvania
 Northwestern Pennsylvania
 Southern Pennsylvania
 Southeastern Pennsylvania
 Southwestern Pennsylvania
 Western Pennsylvania

Administrative divisions of Pennsylvania 

 The 67 Counties of the Commonwealth of Pennsylvania
 Municipalities in Pennsylvania
 Cities in Pennsylvania
 State capital of Pennsylvania:
 City nicknames in Pennsylvania
 Sister cities in Pennsylvania

Demography of Pennsylvania 
Demographics of Pennsylvania
List of people from Pennsylvania

Government and politics of Pennsylvania 

Politics of Pennsylvania
 Form of government: U. S. state government
 United States congressional delegations from Pennsylvania
 Pennsylvania State Capitol
 Elections in Pennsylvania
 Electoral reform in Pennsylvania
 Political party strength in Pennsylvania

Branches of the government of Pennsylvania 

Government of Pennsylvania

Executive branch of the government of Pennsylvania 
Governor of Pennsylvania
Lieutenant Governor of Pennsylvania
 Secretary of the Commonwealth of Pennsylvania
 State Treasurer of Pennsylvania
 State departments
 Pennsylvania Department of Transportation

Legislative branch of the government of Pennsylvania 

 Pennsylvania General Assembly (bicameral)
 Upper house: Pennsylvania Senate
 Lower house: Pennsylvania House of Representatives

Judicial branch of the government of Pennsylvania 

Unified Judicial System of Pennsylvania
 Supreme Court of Pennsylvania

Law and order in Pennsylvania 

Law of Pennsylvania
 Cannabis in Pennsylvania
 Capital punishment in Pennsylvania
 Individuals executed in Pennsylvania
 Constitution of Pennsylvania
 Crime in Pennsylvania
 Gun laws in Pennsylvania
 Law enforcement in Pennsylvania
 Law enforcement agencies in Pennsylvania
 Pennsylvania State Police
 Same-sex marriage in Pennsylvania

Military in Pennsylvania 

 Pennsylvania Air National Guard
 Pennsylvania Army National Guard

Local government in Pennsylvania 

Local government in Pennsylvania

History of Pennsylvania 

History of Pennsylvania

History of Pennsylvania, by period 
Indigenous peoples
 Indentured servitude in Pennsylvania
Netherlands colony of Nieuw-Nederland, 1624–1652
History of slavery in Pennsylvania, 1639–1847
Swedish colony of Nya Sverige, 1638–1655
Netherlands province of Nieuw-Nederland, 1652–1664
English Province of New-York, (1664–1681)–1688
English Province of Pennsylvania, 1681–1707
British Colony of Pennsylvania, 1707–1776
French colony of la Louisiane, 1699–(1754–1763)
French and Indian War, 1754–1763
Treaty of Fontainebleau of 1762
British Indian Reserve in western Pennsylvania, 1763–1783
Royal Proclamation of 1763
American Revolutionary War, April 19, 1775 – September 3, 1783
United States Declaration of Independence, July 4, 1776
Philadelphia campaign, 1777–1778
Battle of Germantown, October 4, 1777
Siege of Fort Mifflin, September 26 to November 16, 1777
Commonwealth of Pennsylvania since 1776
Whiskey Rebellion, 1790s
Eighth state to ratify the Articles of Confederation and Perpetual Union, signed July 9, 1778
Second State to ratify the Constitution of the United States of America on December 11, 1787
Erie Triangle purchased 1792
War of 1812, June 18, 1812 – March 23, 1815
Treaty of Ghent, December 24, 1814
Mexican–American War, April 25, 1846 – February 2, 1848
James Buchanan becomes 15th President of the United States on March 4, 1857
American Civil War, April 12, 1861 – May 13, 1865
Pennsylvania in the American Civil War, 1861–1865
47th Pennsylvania Infantry Regiment
Gettysburg Campaign, June 9 – July 14, 1863
Battle of Gettysburg, July 1–3, 1863
Gettysburg Address, November 19, 1863

History of Pennsylvania, by region

By county 
 History of Allegheny County
 History of Lycoming County
 History of Philadelphia County

By municipality 
 History of Erie
 History of Harrisburg
 History of the Townships of Lycoming County, Pennsylvania
 History of Philadelphia
 History of Pittsburgh
 History of Williamsport

History of Pennsylvania, by subject 
 History of the Pennsylvania State University
 History of rail transport in Philadelphia
 History of slavery in Pennsylvania
 History of veterinary medicine in Pennsylvania
 Jewish history in Pennsylvania

Culture of Pennsylvania 

Culture of Pennsylvania
 Cuisine of Pennsylvania
 Museums in Pennsylvania
 Religion in Pennsylvania
 Episcopal Diocese of Pennsylvania
 Scouting in Pennsylvania
 State symbols of Pennsylvania
 Flag of the Commonwealth of Pennsylvania 
 Great Seal of the Commonwealth of Pennsylvania

The Arts in Pennsylvania 
 Music of Pennsylvania

Sports in Pennsylvania 
Sports in Pennsylvania
Sports in Allentown, Pennsylvania
Sports in Philadelphia
Sports in Pittsburgh

Economy and infrastructure of Pennsylvania

Economy of Pennsylvania
 Communications in Pennsylvania
Allentown economy
 Newspapers in Pennsylvania
 Radio stations in Pennsylvania
 Television stations in Pennsylvania
 Energy in Pennsylvania
 Coal mining in Pennsylvania
 Oil rush in Pennsylvania
 Power stations in Pennsylvania
 Solar power in Pennsylvania
 Wind power in Pennsylvania
 Health care in Pennsylvania
 Hospitals in Pennsylvania
 Transportation in Pennsylvania
 Airports in Pennsylvania
 Roads in Pennsylvania
 Interstate Highways in Pennsylvania

Education in Pennsylvania 

Education in Pennsylvania
 Schools in Pennsylvania
 School districts in Pennsylvania
 High schools in Pennsylvania
 Colleges and universities in Pennsylvania
Cedar Crest College (1867)
DeSales University (1964)
Lafayette College (1826)
Lehigh University (1865)
Moravian College (1742)
Muhlenberg College (1848)
 University of Pennsylvania (1740)
 University of Pittsburgh (1787)
Lincoln University (Pennsylvania) (1854)
 Pennsylvania State University (1855)
 Pennsylvania State System of Higher Education (1857)
 Temple University (1884)

See also

Topic overview:
Pennsylvania

Index of Pennsylvania-related articles

References

External links 

Pennsylvania
 1
 
Pennsylvania